Eirik Horneland (born 14 March 1975) is a Norwegian football coach and former player.

Horneland played as a defender. Following a lengthy career in SK Vard Haugesund and a short loan at Haugesund where he saw some Tippeligaen action, he finished his playing career in FK Haugesund which at the time languished in the 1. divisjon.

He retired after the 2009 season to become assistant manager, occasionally featuring in friendly matches and for the club's B and C team. After five seasons he went on to coach the Norway national under-19 football team. He returned as Haugesund's head coach on 15 October 2016.

In January 2019 he was appointed new manager of Rosenborg. In June 2020, he resigned from his position after only 3 league matches of the 2020 season  On 18 October 2020, Horneland was appointed new assistant manager of Brann. On 10 August 2021, after the sacking of Kåre Ingebrigtsen, Horneland was promoted to the role of head coach on a deal until the end of the 2021 season.

Managerial statistics (all official matches)

References

1975 births
Living people
People from Haugesund
Norwegian footballers
Norwegian First Division players
Eliteserien players
SK Vard Haugesund players
FK Haugesund players
Norwegian football managers
FK Haugesund managers
Rosenborg BK managers
SK Brann managers
Eliteserien managers
Association football defenders
Sportspeople from Rogaland